Profundulidae is a family of killifishes. The species of this family are native to Central America and Mexico.

Genera 
The family consists of a single genus:

 Profundulus Hubbs, 1924

However, some workers raise an additional genus and place five of the nine species of Profundulus in the new genus Tlaloc.Álvarez & Carranza, 1951

References

External links 
 
 

 
Cyprinodontiformes
Ray-finned fish families
Taxa named by Jacobus Johannes Hoedeman